Smolarek is a Polish surname. Notable people with the surname include:

  (born 1960), Polish musicologist 
 Euzebiusz Smolarek (born 1981, Łódź), Polish football player
 Joanna Smolarek (born 1952), Polish track and field sprinter
 Ryszard Smolarek (born 1952), Polish politician
  (born 1937), artist painter
 Włodzimierz Smolarek (1957–2012), Polish football player
  (born 1946), Polish military man
  (born 1938), Polish officer

See also

Smolar

Polish-language surnames
Occupational surnames